Yeghegis Community ( Yeghegis Hamaynk), is a rural community (municipality) and administrative subdivision of Vayots Dzor Province of Armenia, at the southeast of the country. Consisted of a group of settlements, its administrative centre is the village of Shatin.

Included settlements

See also
Vayots Dzor Province

References

Communities in Vayots Dzor Province
2017 establishments in Armenia